Marcus Patterson (born February 8, 1995) is an American-Jamaican professional basketball player for BC Teuta Durrës of the Albanian Basketball Superleague and Liga Unike. He played college basketball for Russell Sage.

Early life and personal life 
Patterson was born and raised in the Bronx, New York. He attended and played basketball at Mount Saint Michael Academy, where he helped his team to the 2011 CHSAA City A Championship. He has five brothers, including Tyshawn, who played ball at Stetson University.

College career 
Patterson attended Russell Sage College, where he majored in business administration and played basketball for the Sage Gators.

In 2013–14, he played in twenty-four contests and made eight starts. He earned Skyline Conference Rookie of the Week Honors on February 10 after helping the Gators to key Skyline wins over NYU-Poly and St. Joseph's College (LI). Patterson averaged 11.0 points, 5.0 rebounds and 2.0 assists as Sage notched wins over St. Joseph's-L.I. (69-59) and NYU-Poly (78-69)

In 2014–2015, he was a member of the Gator Skyline Conference Championship. The Gators also got 15 points from sophomore forward Patterson.

In 2015–2016, he started 23 of 26 games played while adding 276 points. Patterson averaged 10.6 points and 6.7 rebounds per outing for the Gators. He earned numerous awards including a selection to the Nazareth College All-Tournament Team.

Patterson rose to success at Sage where he earned First-Team All-Skyline Conference honors as a senior and was named the school’s 2016–17 Male Athlete of the Year. Patterson ranked in 10 statistical categories nationally in Division III. He was ranked 74th nationally in total field goals attempted (381) after wrapping his stellar athletic career 1,021 career points, the third highest total among all Sage men's basketball players. Patterson also stands second all-time with his 552 rebounds in 102 career games played, which is also tied for second best all-time at Sage. Patterson finished his senior season with 477 points, which is the most points scored in a single-season in the history of the squad. Patterson averaged a team-best 17.7 ppg with a 7.5 rpg average in his 30.5 minutes per game. Patterson added 30 or more points three times, including a pair of 31 point showings. He earned seven selections to the Skyline Conference Weekly Honor Roll and scored double digits in all but three of his 27 games played and started this past season. He added eight double-doubles and was nationally ranked 111th with his double-doubles. By year's end, Sage earned a 17-10 record, while also bringing home the 2017 Skyline Conference Runner-up Trophy after winning the league's North Division III regular-season crown.

In 2017–18, Patterson earned a master's degree in Applied Positive Psychology from the University of East London while playing for the school's basketball team.

College statistics 

|-
| align="left" | 2013–14
| align="left" | Russell Sage College
| 24 || 8 || 13.9 || .457 || .308 || .571 || 3.4 || 0.8 || 0.3 || 0.2 || 4.8
|-
| align="left" | 2014–15
| align="left" | Russell Sage College
| 25 || 2 || 14.5 || .404 || .286 || .593 || 3.6 || 0.6 || 0.2 || 0.4 || 6.0
|-
| align="left" | 2015–16
| align="left" | Russell Sage College
| 26 || 23 || 23.8 || .461 || .304 || .756 || 6.7 || 0.6 || 0.8 || 0.5 || 10.6
|-
| align="left" | 2016–17
| align="left" | Russell Sage College
| 27 || 26 || 30.5 || .457 || .328 || .741 || 7.5 || 1.4 || 1.4 || 0.2 || 17.6
|-
| align="left" | Career
| align="left" |
| 102 || 59 || 21.0 || .449  || .314 || .704 || 5.4 || 0.9 || 0.9 || 0.3|| 10.0
|-

Professional career

East London All-Stars 
In 2017–2018, Patterson became a member of the East London All-Stars in the England National Basketball League.

Portimonense S.C. 
In September 2019, Patterson went to play for Portimonense S.C. in Portugal. He received two accolades from Eurobasket.com, being named in the ‘All Portuguese 1st Division All-Import Team’ and the ‘All Portuguese 1st Division 2nd Team’. Patterson averaged 22 points per game, 9 rebounds per game and 2 steals per game.

C.A. Queluz 
In October 2020, Patterson signed with C.A. Queluz of the Proliga basketball league. Patterson averaged 8.2 points, three rebounds and 1.7 assists from four games before COVID-19 postponed the season.

Return to Portimonense S.C. 
In December 2021, Patterson returned back to Portimonense. He was the team’s second-leading scorer, averaging 14.3 points, 4.9 rebounds, and 1.5 assist on a blistering 64.1% shooting inside the arc in under 25 minutes a game.

Teuta 
On December 6, 2022, Patterson made his debut with Teuta of the Albanian basketball Superleague. Patterson helped Teuta to victory in the Albanian basketball cup and led all scorers with 29 points.

References

External links 
  Sage Gators bio
 Twitter page
 The Next Prospect

Living people
1995 births
African-American basketball players
American expatriate basketball people in the United Kingdom
American expatriate basketball people in Portugal
Basketball players from New York City
Shooting guards
Russell Sage College alumni
Sportspeople from the Bronx
American sportspeople of Jamaican descent
Jamaican men's basketball players
C.A. Queluz players